Emila is a given name. Notable people with the name include:

Emila (singer), Norwegian singer
Emila Huch (born 1951), Samoan weightlifter
Emila Medková, née Emila Tláskalová (1928–1985), Czech photographer

See also
Emil (given name)
Emilia (given name)